Luis Manuel Seijas Gunther (born 23 June 1986) is a Venezuelan footballer who plays as a midfielder for Phoenix Rising FC of the USL Championship

Club career

After a successful run with the Venezuelan youth squads Seijas was taken to Banfield in Argentina and later made a big impact in his home country with Deportivo Táchira and later was taken to Santa Fe that was looking to rebuild their team after finishing last in the Colombian league. Seijas signed a three-year contract with Belgian giants Standard de Liège on 30 August 2011 after a very successful time spent with Santa Fe. On 2 May 2013 he broke his contract with Standard de Liège and he left the club. On July 16, 2013, Seijas came to Terms with Ecuadorian Club, Deportivo Quito. On May 23, 2016 Seijas arrived in Porto Alegre to sign and join Internacional. Seijas signed with Phoenix Rising FC on September 8, 2021.

Club statistics

International career
Seijas has made 51 appearances for the senior Venezuela national football team since his debut in 2006.

International goals

|-
| 1. || 23 May 2012 || Polideportivo Cachamay, Puerto Ordaz, Venezuela ||  || 1–0 || 4–0 || Friendly
|-
| 2. || 11 October 2013 || Pueblo Nuevo, San Cristóbal, Venezuela ||  || 1–1 || 1–1 || 2014 FIFA World Cup qualification
|}

Honours

Club
Santa Fe
Copa Colombia: 2009
Categoria Primera A: 2014
Copa Sudamericana: 2015

References

External links

Profile at GolGolGol

1986 births
Living people
Sportspeople from Valencia, Venezuela
Venezuelan people of Peruvian descent
Venezuelan people of German descent
Venezuelan footballers
Venezuela international footballers
Venezuelan expatriate footballers
Club Atlético Banfield footballers
Caracas FC players
Deportivo Táchira F.C. players
Independiente Santa Fe footballers
Phoenix Rising FC players
Standard Liège players
S.D. Quito footballers
Sport Club Internacional players
Associação Chapecoense de Futebol players
Argentine Primera División players
Venezuelan Primera División players
Belgian Pro League players
Campeonato Brasileiro Série A players
Ecuadorian Serie A players
Categoría Primera A players
USL Championship players
2011 Copa América players
2015 Copa América players
Copa América Centenario players
Expatriate footballers in Argentina
Expatriate footballers in Colombia
Expatriate footballers in Belgium
Expatriate footballers in Ecuador
Expatriate footballers in Brazil
Venezuelan expatriate sportspeople in Argentina
Venezuelan expatriate sportspeople in Belgium
Venezuelan expatriate sportspeople in Colombia
Venezuelan expatriate sportspeople in Brazil
Venezuelan expatriate sportspeople in Ecuador
Association football midfielders
2019 Copa América players
Venezuelan expatriate sportspeople in the United States
Expatriate soccer players in the United States